Hector McDonald Gilfillan (26 February 1903 – q2 1970) was an English footballer who played as an outside left in the Football League for Darlington and in non-league football for Workington.

Life and career
Gilfillan was born in Winlaton, County Durham, the sixth and, at the time of the 1911 census, youngest child of John Gilfillan and his wife Ann, who kept the Old House Inn in Winlaton.

By early in the 1925–26 season, Gilfillan was playing for Workington in the North Eastern League, scoring against Scotswood and twice against Hartlepools United reserves. In March 1926, he was a reserve for the Northern Counties team selected for a match against a Football Association eleven. The following season, he opened the scoring in Workington's first-round FA Cup match against Crook Town, but his team's overly casual attitude allowed the visitors to make a winning comeback.

Gilfillan signed for Third Division club Darlington in July 1927. He went straight into the first team for the opening match of the season, and kept his place for the next few matches, but played only seven times before leaving the club.

Gilfillan died in County Durham in 1970 at the age of 67.

Notes

References

1903 births
1970 deaths
People from Winlaton
Footballers from Tyne and Wear
Footballers from County Durham
English footballers
Association football wingers
Workington A.F.C. players
Darlington F.C. players
Northern Football League players
English Football League players